William Hollrock (born February 15, 1940) is an American bobsledder. He competed in the four man event at the 1976 Winter Olympics.

References

1940 births
Living people
American male bobsledders
Olympic bobsledders of the United States
Bobsledders at the 1976 Winter Olympics
People from White Plains, New York